XHERJ-FM is a radio station on 105.1 FM in Mazatlán, Sinaloa. It is owned by Promomedios and is known as La Nueva RJ.

History
XERJ-AM 1320 received its concession on January 10, 1940. It was owned by Oscar Pérez Escobosa, and by the 1960s, XERJ, which had been transferred to Radio Mazatlán, S.A. in 1958, broadcast with 5,000 watts day and 500 night—a power level it would retain for decades.

XERJ migrated to FM in 2010 as XHERJ-FM 107.5. As part of the 2017 renewal of XHERJ's concession, it moved to 105.1 MHz on July 8, 2018 in order to clear 106-108 MHz as much as possible for community and indigenous radio stations.

References

Radio stations in Sinaloa
Radio stations established in 1940